Talmy is a surname. Notable people with the surname include:
 Leonard Talmy, American linguist
 Shel Talmy (born 1937), American record producer, songwriter and arranger

See also
 Talmi